John Brunning is an English radio presenter, musician and composer. On Classic FM he presents Classic FM Drive.

Brunning was born in Essex and from 1970 broadcast pirate radio from his home in Colchester. He learned guitar and played for a time with the successful band Mungo Jerry.  In 1986 he began broadcasting on local radio. He is the only Classic FM presenter to have worked on the station continuously since it began broadcasting in 1992. In the course of this association, he has presented the Drive and Chart programmes, as well as Smooth Classics.

Composition
Brunning's 2006 composition, Pie Jesu, was first recorded by the vocal group All Angels, and has since been recorded by several other artistes including the King's Singers (2010). The Pie Jesu is one of seven movements that together form the oratorio Amazing Day and another piece from this work, his setting of "Ave Maria", was recorded by the Welsh soprano Katherine Jenkins (2011). He has also composed several pieces for guitar, and Sahara and Romance No.1 (2010) have been recorded by both Xuefei Yang and Craig Ogden. Ogden gave the first performance of 'Concerto Magna Carta' for guitar and small orchestra in 2015, and has since recorded the slow movement from it.

Personal life
He is married with two children.

Albums
Amazing Day

References

External links
Official website
Classic FM’s More Music Drive on Classic FM
Smooth Classics at Seven on Classic FM
John Brunning on Classic FM

1954 births
English composers
English radio presenters
Living people
People from Colchester